Beijing Public Service Radio is a radio station located in Beijing, China. It generally broadcasts local news about events within Beijing. The station broadcasts on FM 107.3 in Beijing, China and is one of the stations in the Beijing Ren Min Guangbo Dian Tai group.

External links
 Official Website (Chinese)

Mandarin-language radio stations
Radio stations in China
Mass media in Beijing